Werthenstein railway station is a railway station in the municipality of Ruswil, in the Swiss canton of Lucerne. It is an intermediate stop on the standard gauge Bern–Lucerne line of Swiss Federal Railways. The station is named for and serves the municipality of Werthenstein, located across the Kleine Emme.

Services 
The following services stop at Werthenstein:

References

External links 
 
 

Railway stations in the canton of Lucerne
Swiss Federal Railways stations